Gaupp is the surname of: 

 Ernst Gaupp (1865–1916), a German anatomist 
 Robert Gaupp (1870–1953), a German psychiatrist and neurologist
 Natalie Gaupp (b. 1967), an American playwright